Finnur Garðarsson (born 20 March 1952) is an Icelandic former freestyle swimmer. He competed in two events at the 1972 Summer Olympics.

References

External links
 

1952 births
Living people
Finnur Gardarsson
Finnur Gardarsson
Swimmers at the 1972 Summer Olympics
Place of birth missing (living people)